Slavomír Pavličko (born 11 June 1972) is a Slovak former professional ice hockey winger. He played with clubs including HC Slovan Bratislava in the Slovak Extraliga.

References

External links

1972 births
Living people
MHK Kežmarok players
HK Nitra players
HK Partizan players
HK Poprad players
HC Prešov players
HC Slovan Bratislava players
Slovak ice hockey left wingers
HK Spišská Nová Ves players
Sportspeople from Poprad
PSG Berani Zlín players
Slovak expatriate ice hockey players in the Czech Republic
Expatriate ice hockey players in Serbia
Slovak expatriate sportspeople in Serbia